Clément Pinault (4 February 1985 – 22 January 2009) was a French professional footballer who played as a defender.

Career 
Born in Grasse, Alpes-Maritimes, Pinault began his career with Le Mans UC72. He on loan to Angers SCO in the summer of 2006. Pinault joined Clermont Foot from Ligue 1 side Le Mans in June 2008.

Personal life 
He was the brother of footballer Thomas Pinault.

Death 
Pinault died on 22 January 2009, four days after suffering a heart attack. He had been taken to hospital on 18 January after collapsing at his home and was in an artificial coma until his death.

Pinault played for Clermont two days before his heart attack, in a 2–0 Ligue 2 win over Brest, and recent health checks had not suggested any heart problems.

References

External links 

1985 births
2009 deaths
People from Grasse
Sportspeople from Alpes-Maritimes
French footballers
Association football defenders
Le Mans FC players
Angers SCO players
Clermont Foot players
Ligue 1 players
Ligue 2 players
Footballers from Provence-Alpes-Côte d'Azur